Milrose Munce and the Den of Professional Help is a 2007 young adult novel by Douglas Anthony Cooper and is his first book in the genre.

Synopsis
The book follows teenagers Milrose and Arabella, who can see the ghosts that inhabit their school. Some of the ghosts are friendly, others are not so much, but after Milrose and Arabella are both sent to the school psychologist to receive treatment the ghosts must find a way to help the two overcome their seemingly well-meaning captor.

Reviews
Sowetan gave a positive review for the book, saying it "is one of those books that make you question why you ever decided on getting professional help in the first place".

References

External links
 Dysmedia Cooper's Home Page

2007 Canadian novels
Canadian young adult novels
Young adult fantasy novels
Canadian Gothic novels
Ghost novels
Novels by Douglas Cooper
Doubleday Canada books